The 2010–11 Barangay Ginebra Kings season was the 32nd season of the franchise in the Philippine Basketball Association (PBA).

Key dates
August 29: The 2010 PBA draft took place in Fort Bonifacio, Taguig.

Draft picks

Roster

Philippine Cup

Eliminations

Standings

Commissioner's Cup

Eliminations

Standings

Finals

Governors Cup

Eliminations

Standings

Semifinals

Standings

Transactions

Pre-season

Trades

Free agents

Subtractions

Governors Cup

Trades

Imports recruited

References

Barangay Ginebra San Miguel seasons
Barangay Ginebra